Daniël Nicolas Maria Johanes Krutzen (born 19 September 1996) is a Dutch professional footballer plays as a defender for Phoenix Rising FC of the USL Championship.

Early life
Born in Brunssum, Netherlands, Krutzen was raised in Lanaken, Belgium. Krutzen began his youth career with K. Lanaken VV. In 2003, he joined the Genk youth academy. In 2014, he signed a professional contract with Genk. In 2016, he was released by Genk.

College career
In 2016, Krutzen moved to the United States to attend the University at Albany, SUNY, where he played for the men's soccer team. He scored his first collegiate goal on September 17, 2016, in a 1–0 victory over the Rhode Island Rams. In his second season in 2017, he led the America East Conference with seven assists, en route to being named an America East First Team All-Star, All-East First Team All-Star, All-America Third-Team, Scholar All-America First Team, Scholar All-East America East All-Academic. On October 9, 2018, he set a school record, recording four assists in a single game in a 6–2 victory over the American Eagles. In 2018, he was named to America East Fall Scholar-Athlete, SUNY Presidential Scholar-Athlete, USC Scholar All-America Second Team, Senior CLASS Second Team, USC Scholar All-East First Team, USC All-Northeast Second Team, and an America East All-Academic.

Club career

Early career
In 2017, he played for FC Tucson in the Premier Development League, scoring five goals in seven appearances.

In 2018, he played for Reading United AC in the Premier Development League, scoring two goals in nine appearances. After the season, he was ranked seventh on the PDL Top Prospects list.

Forge FC
In March 2019, he signed a professional contract with Forge FC in the Canadian Premier League. In his first season with the club in 2019, he helped them win the championship. The following season, he again won the league tile while leading the league in both interceptions and defensive touches. On November 4, 2020, he scored a stoppage time winner against Panamanian club Tauro FC to send Forge through to the quarter-finals of the CONCACAF League.

In January 2021, he went on trial with Swedish clubs Örebro SK, followed by a trial with another Swedish club Helsingborgs IF. In February 2021, he signed a two-year extension with Forge. On November 24, 2021, he tore his ACL in a CONCACAF League match against Honduran club FC Motagua, which forced him to miss ten months of action. He returned to action near the end of the 2022 season, helping Forge win the 2022 CPL championship for the third time in four years. He departed the club following that season. Following Forge FC's 2022 season, Krutzen was reported to be training with Whitecaps FC 2. He was then subsequently invited to trial with the Vancouver Whitecaps first team for their 2023 pre-season. After appearing in a friendly for the Whitecaps against German club Hamburger SV, he departed the Whitecaps without earning a contract.

Phoenix Rising FC
In January 2023, Krutzen signed with Phoenix Rising FC.

Career statistics

Honours

Club
Forge FC
Canadian Premier League: 2019, 2020, 2022

External links

References

1996 births
Living people
Association football defenders
Belgian footballers
Dutch footballers
People from Brunssum
People from Lanaken
Belgian expatriate footballers
Dutch expatriate footballers
Expatriate soccer players in the United States
Belgian expatriate sportspeople in the United States
Dutch expatriate sportspeople in the United States
Expatriate soccer players in Canada
Belgian expatriate sportspeople in Canada
Dutch expatriate sportspeople in Canada
Albany Great Danes men's soccer players
FC Tucson players
Reading United A.C. players
Forge FC players
Phoenix Rising FC players
USL League Two players
Canadian Premier League players
USL Championship players
Footballers from Limburg (Belgium)
Footballers from Limburg (Netherlands)